Reinhard Seiler (30 August 1909 – 6 October 1989) was a Spanish Civil War and World War II Luftwaffe Major  and ace, commander of Jagdgeschwader 104 and a winner of the Knight's Cross of the Iron Cross with Oak Leaves of Nazi Germany; for the fighter pilots, it was a quantifiable measure of skill and combat success. Reinhard Seiler was credited with 100 victories during World War II, over the course of about 500 combat missions. He recorded an additional 9 victories during the Spanish Civil War.

Childhood and early career
Seiler was born on 30 August 1909 in Rawitsch, in the Province of Posen, at the time a Prussian province of the German Empire and now in Poland. He was the son of Justizoberwachtmeister, a police officer at court. He joined the newly created Luftwaffe in 1935 and was promoted to Leutnant (second lieutenant) on 20 April 1937. After completing his pilot training, he was sent to Spain with the Condor Legion, and served with 2. Staffel (2nd squadron) of Jagdgruppe 88 (J/88—88th Fighter Group). 

On 26 August 1937, the Condor Legion attacked ships in the harbor of Gijón. Flying fighter escort to the bombers, Seiler claimed his first aerial victory when he shot down a Polikarpov I-15 fighter. He claimed his second aerial victory on 4 September, a Polikarpov I-16 shot down over Asturias. On 30 October, command of the Condor Legion transferred from Generalmajor Hugo Sperrle to Generalmajor Hellmuth Volkmann. Volkmann reorganized J/88, placing 2. Staffel under the command of Oberleutnant (First Lieutenant) Joachim Schlichting. Seiler claimed his third aerial victory on 29 November.

When Seiler returned to Germany, he was credited with nine aerial victories and was one of the leading fighter pilots of the Condor Legion. For his service in Spain, he was awarded the Spanish Cross in Gold with Diamonds. He was promoted to Oberleutnant on 1 April 1939.

After his return from Spain, Seiler was appointed the Staffelkapitän (Squadron leader) of the newly established 1. Staffel of Jagdgeschwader 70 (JG 70—70th Fighter Wing) on 15 July 1939. The Staffel was based at Herzogenaurach, equipped with the Messerschmitt Bf 109 D-1 and subordinated to the I. Gruppe (1st group) of Jagdgeschwader 51 (JG 51—51st Fighter Wing) under the command of Major Ernst Freiherr von Berg.

World War II
World War II in Europe began on Friday 1 September 1939 when German forces invaded Poland. Seiler's unit was kept back and on 13 September, it formed the nucleus of the newly created I Gruppe of Jagdgeschwader 54 (JG 54—54th Fighter Wing) which had been placed under command of Major Hans-Jürgen von Cramon-Taubadel. In consequence, Seiler's 1 Staffel was renamed 1. Staffel of JG 54. On 1 November, the Gruppe was transferred to Böblingen to patrol the southernmost region of the French-German border.

He scored his first victory of the war on 10 January 1940, shooting down a French reconnaissance Potez southwest of Freiburg. He scored a second victory on 7 April west of Strasbourg. However he scored no further in the subsequent Battle of France, when his unit covered the Panzer advance through the Ardennes forests and later over the Dunkirk bridgehead. Pulled out early, back to occupied Netherlands as the campaign wound down, I./JG 54 was then one of the first units to re-occupy the Pas de Calais, in early August 1940 in anticipation of the upcoming Battle of Britain. On a bomber escort mission over Dover on 5 August 1940, Seiler scored his third victory (a Spitfire), but was bounced by a Hurricane squadron, shot down and severely injured. Taking to his parachute over the English Channel, he was rescued and hospitalised, but was out of action for over 6 months.

Invasion of the Soviet Union
Promoted to Hauptmann (Captain) in December, he returned to his command of 1./JG 54 in the spring of 1941, as the Luftwaffe prepared for the upcoming invasion of Russia - Operation Barbarossa. JG 54 was tasked with providing the fighter cover for Army Group North and its advance toward Leningrad. On the opening day of the campaign (22 June 1941) he shot down 3 aircraft, thereby doubling his score, and as his unit leap-frogged to new airbases across the Baltic States over the next few weeks his score continued to rise. He had been awarded the Honor Goblet of the Luftwaffe on 20 August recognising his leadership and combat success.

With the loss of Arnold Lignitz on 30 September (shot down over Leningrad), Hauptmann Seiler was assigned to command III. Gruppe (also based at Siverskaya), as Barbarossa entered its critical phase. Despite surrounding the city, it could not be taken so Hitler decided instead to besiege it. For the next three years, JG 54 would stay, essentially, encamped outside the city interdicting the supply lines and intercepting the frantic attempts of the Russians to lift the siege in offensive after offensive.

Seiler himself remained as Gruppenkommandeur of III./JG 54 for nearly one and a half years. He was awarded the German Cross in Gold on 15 October then the Knight's Cross of the Iron Cross on 20 December 1941, having flown 200 missions. In spring 1942 Geschwaderkommodore (Wing Commander) Hannes Trautloft had the idea for fighter interceptions of Soviet night-harassment raids on moonlit nights. A great success, they claimed 56 victories for no losses. Seiler was the most successful pilot in these missions, scoring 16 night-victories between March and June 1942 and he was also promoted to Major in June. Throughout 1942, JG 54 continued to cover the north: the Leningrad siege and Demyansk fronts. In December though, Seiler took his III./JG 54 to Smolensk in the centre, and then soon after in early 1943 rotated back to the west as part of Adolf Galland's mis-guided plan to swap units between the western and eastern fronts in exchange for I./Jagdgeschwader 26 (JG 26—26th Fighter Wing).

"Defence of the Reich"
Re-equipping instead onto Bf 109G-4s, they spent 6 weeks on the Channel Front. Unused to operating at higher altitudes and in large formations, JG 26 Geschwaderkommodore Josef Priller refused to declare the unit ready for operations. Finally in March, they were transferred back to Oldenburg in northern Germany for further training and to stay on Defence of the Reich duties. Fittingly perhaps, with the unit's first successes on 17 April, unit commander Seiler scored his one and only Viermot (4-engine bomber) kill. However, he was already under orders to return to the Leningrad Front. On 1 May, Seiler was made the new Gruppenkommandeur of I. Gruppe of JG 54, flying the Focke-Wulf Fw 190. He replaced Hauptmann Gerhard Koall who temporarily led the Gruppe after Major Hans Philipp was transferred to take command of Jagdgeschwader 1 (JG 1—1st Fighter Wing) fighting in Defence of the Reich.

Eastern Front
Unseasonably bad weather limited operations for the next few months and then all attention was turned to the main 1943 offensive - Operation Citadel against the Kursk salient. Seiler's I./JG 54 was transferred in June to Orel to join the fighter cover over the northern attack. On the opening day of the offensive, 5 July, he scored 5 victories to take his tally to 97. The following day he scored a further two kills. Eager to reach the magic 'century', he chased and shot down a Bell P-39 Airacobra fighters from the 30 GvIAP (Guards Fighter Aviation Regiment—Gvardeyskiy Istrebitelny Aviatsionny Polk). However immediately afterward he was himself shot and forced to bail out badly wounded over enemy territory east of Ponyri, midway between Orel and Kursk. He was the 44th Luftwaffe pilot to achieve the century mark. He was declared unfit for further combat duties.

In recognition of his long service and command in JG 54, he was awarded the Knight's Cross of the Iron Cross with Oak Leaves on 2 March 1944. Later in the year, on 8 August, he was appointed Geschwaderkommodore of the fighter-pilot training unit Jagdgeschwader 104 and served in this position until it was disbanded on 28 April 1945, just days before the end of World War II. Released in 1946, Reinhard Seiler died on 6 October 1989, at the age of 80, in the town of Grafengehaig near Kulmbach, in Bavaria. Over approximately 500 missions, he was credited with 109 air victories, including 9 in Spain and just 4 in the west. The remaining 96 victories were scored over the Russian Front.

Summary of career

Aerial victory claims
According to US historian David T. Zabecki, Seiler was credited with 100 aerial victories during World War II. Spick lists Seiler with 9 aerial victories during the Spanish Civil War and further 100 during World War II. Mathews and Foreman, authors of Luftwaffe Aces — Biographies and Victory Claims, researched the German Federal Archives and found documentation for 109 aerial victory claims, plus three further unconfirmed claims. This number includes 9 claims during the Spanish Civil War, 96 on the Eastern Front, and 4 on the Western Front, including one four-engined bomber.

Victory claims were logged to a map-reference (PQ = Planquadrat), for example "PQ 00254". These sectors were then subdivided into 36 smaller units to give a location area 3 × 4 km in size.

Awards
 Spanish Cross in Gold with Swords and Diamonds (6 June 1939)
 Iron Cross (1939)
 2nd Class (20 January 1940)
 1st Class (30 July 1940)
 Honor Goblet of the Luftwaffe (20 August 1941)
 German Cross in Gold on 15 October 1941 as Hauptmann in the 1./Jagdgeschwader 54
 Knight's Cross of the Iron Cross with Oak Leaves
 Knight's Cross on 20 December 1941 as Hauptmann and Gruppenkommandeur of the III./Jagdgeschwader 54
 419th Oak Leaves on 2 March 1944 as Major and Gruppenkommandeur of the I./Jagdgeschwader 54

Promotions

Notes

References

Citations

Bibliography

 
 
 
 
 
 
 
 
 
 
 
 
 
 
 
 
 
 
 
 
 
 
 
 
 

1909 births
1989 deaths
People from Rawicz
Condor Legion personnel
People from the Province of Posen
Spanish Civil War flying aces
German World War II flying aces
Recipients of the Gold German Cross
Recipients of the Knight's Cross of the Iron Cross with Oak Leaves